James Troy (born 11 April 1960) is an Irish retired hurler who played for club side Lusmagh and at inter-county level with the Offaly senior hurling team.

Career

Born in Lusmagh, County Offaly, Troy first came to prominence during a two-year spell as goalkeeper with the Offaly minor team. After a period with the under-21 side, he joined the Offaly senior team as understudy to Damien Martin during the 1981-82 National League. Troy claimed his first silverware in 1984 when Offaly won the Leinster Championship. He took over as first-choice goalkeeper the following year and ended the season as an All-Ireland Championship-winner after a defeat of Galway in the final. Troy won a further three provincial titles between 1988 and 1990, the last of which saw him captain the team as a result of Lusmagh's County Championship success the previous year. The success continued with Offaly claiming the 1990-91 league. Troy won a sixth provincial medal in 1994 before ending the season with a second All-Ireland winners' medal alongside his brother John. His inclusion on the Leinster team saw him claim two Railway Cup medals.

Honours

Lusmagh
Offaly Senior Hurling Championship: 1989

Offaly
All-Ireland Senior Hurling Championship: 1985, 1994
Leinster Senior Hurling Championship: 1984, 1985, 1988, 1989, 1990 (c), 1994
National Hurling League: 1990-91

Leinster
Railway Cup: 1988, 1993

References

1960 births
Living people
Bord na Móna people
Lusmagh hurlers
Offaly inter-county hurlers
Leinster inter-provincial hurlers
Hurling goalkeepers
All-Ireland Senior Hurling Championship winners